Chilorhinophis carpenteri, or the Liwale two-headed snake, is a species of venomous snake in the family Atractaspididae. The species is native to southeastern Africa.

Geographic range
C. carpenteri is found in Mozambique and southeastern Tanzania.

Taxonomy
C. carpenteri was originally named Parkerophis carpenteri. Some herpetologists, including Battersby, consider C. carpenteri to be a synonym of C. butleri.

Etymology
The specific name, carpenteri'', honors the type specimen's collector, British physician and entomologist Geoffrey Douglas Hale Carpenter.

References

Atractaspididae
Reptiles described in 1927